is the professional name of , a Japanese writer. Onda has won the Yoshikawa Eiji Prize for New Writers, the Japan Booksellers' Award, the Mystery Writers of Japan Award for Best Novel, the Yamamoto Shūgorō Prize, and the Naoki Prize. Her work has been adapted for film and television.

Early life and education
Onda was born in 1964 in Aomori, Japan but raised in Sendai in Miyagi Prefecture. She graduated from Waseda University in 1987 and worked in an office for several years, then quit her job to try writing a novel after reading Ken'ichi Sakemi's 1991 novel .

Career
Onda made her literary debut in 1992 with the novel , which was adapted into the 2000 NHK show  starring Anne Suzuki and Chiaki Kuriyama. More novels and adaptations followed, including the 1999 novel , which was adapted into a 2002 film, and the 2000 novel , which was adapted into a 2001 TBS television series starring Tsubasa Imai.

In 2005 Onda won the 26th Yoshikawa Eiji Prize for New Writers and the 2nd Japan Booksellers' Award Grand Prize for her novel , a story about two half-siblings participating in their school's annual hike. Yoru no pikunikku was adapted into a 2006 film of the same name, directed by Masahiko Nagasawa and starring Mikako Tabe. After being previously nominated for a 58th Mystery Writers of Japan Award for her book Q&A in 2005, Onda won the 59th Mystery Writers of Japan Award for Best Novel in 2006 for her murder mystery . The next year she won the 20th Yamamoto Shūgorō Prize for her book , a complex story about a playwright writing a play about a playwright who is murdered while writing a play. Onda's 2011 novel  was adapted into the 2012 television drama Akumu-chan, starring Keiko Kitagawa and shown on Nippon TV. An Akumu-chan film sequel, also starring Keiko Kitagawa, premiered in 2014. 

In 2017, after having been nominated six different times for the Naoki Prize, Onda won the 156th Naoki Prize for her 2016 book , a story about an international piano competition. Mitsubachi to enrai also won the Japan Booksellers Award Grand Prize in 2017. After winning the Naoki Award Onda visited her hometown of Sendai and received a special award from Mayor Emiko Okuyama.

Recognition
 2005 26th Yoshikawa Eiji Prize for New Writers
 2005 2nd Japan Booksellers' Award Grand Prize
 2006 59th Mystery Writers of Japan Award
 2007 20th Yamamoto Shūgorō Prize
 2017 156th Naoki Prize (2016下)
 2017 14th Japan Booksellers' Award Grand Prize

Film and other adaptations

Film
, 2002
, 2006
 Akumu-chan (悪夢ちゃん The夢ovie), 2014
 Listen to the Universe (Mitsubachi to enrai), 2019

Television
 
 , TBS, 2001
 , Nippon TV, 2012

Bibliography

Selected works in Japanese
 , Shinchosha, 1992, 
 , Tokuma Shoten, 1999, 
 , Shueisha, 2000, 
 Q&A, Gentosha, 2004, 
 , Shinchosha, 2004, 
 , Kadokawa Shoten, 2005, 
 , Shinchosha, 2006, 
 , Kadokawa Shoten, 2011, 
 , Gentosha, 2016,

Selected works in English
 "The Big Drawer", translated by Nora Stevens Heath, Speculative Japan 2, 2011
 "The Warning", translated by Mikhail S. Ignatov, Speculative Japan 3, 2012
 The Aosawa Murders, translated by Alison Watts, 2020
 Fish Swimming in Dappled Sunlight, translated by Alison Watts, 2022

References

1964 births
Living people
21st-century Japanese novelists
21st-century Japanese women writers
Japanese women novelists
Naoki Prize winners
Waseda University alumni
Writers from Miyagi Prefecture